The arrondissement of Millau is an arrondissement of France in the Aveyron department in the Occitanie region. It has 110 communes.

Composition

The communes of the arrondissement of Millau, and their INSEE codes, are:

 Agen-d'Aveyron (12001)
 Aguessac (12002)
 Alrance (12006)
 Arnac-sur-Dourdou (12009)
 Arques (12010)
 Arvieu (12011)
 Auriac-Lagast (12015)
 Ayssènes (12017)
 Balaguier-sur-Rance (12019)
 La Bastide-Pradines (12022)
 La Bastide-Solages (12023)
 Belmont-sur-Rance (12025)
 Brasc (12035)
 Broquiès (12037)
 Brousse-le-Château (12038)
 Brusque (12039)
 Calmels-et-le-Viala (12042)
 Camarès (12044)
 Canet-de-Salars (12050)
 Castelnau-Pégayrols (12062)
 La Cavalerie (12063)
 Le Clapier (12067)
 Combret (12069)
 Compeyre (12070)
 Comprégnac (12072)
 Comps-la-Grand-Ville (12073)
 Connac (12075)
 Cornus (12077)
 Les Costes-Gozon (12078)
 Coupiac (12080)
 La Couvertoirade (12082)
 Creissels (12084)
 La Cresse (12086)
 Curan (12307)
 Durenque (12092)
 Fayet (12099)
 Flavin (12102)
 Fondamente (12155)
 Gissac (12109)
 L'Hospitalet-du-Larzac (12115)
 Lapanouse-de-Cernon (12122)
 Laval-Roquecezière (12125)
 Lédergues (12127)
 Lestrade-et-Thouels (12129)
 Marnhagues-et-Latour (12139)
 Martrin (12141)
 Mélagues (12143)
 Millau (12145)
 Montagnol (12147)
 Montclar (12149)
 Montfranc (12152)
 Montjaux (12153)
 Montlaur (12154)
 Mostuéjouls (12160)
 Mounes-Prohencoux (12192)
 Murasson (12163)
 Nant (12168)
 Paulhe (12178)
 Peux-et-Couffouleux (12179)
 Peyreleau (12180)
 Plaisance (12183)
 Pont-de-Salars (12185)
 Pousthomy (12186)
 Prades-Salars (12188)
 Rebourguil (12195)
 Réquista (12197)
 Rivière-sur-Tarn (12200)
 Roquefort-sur-Soulzon (12203)
 La Roque-Sainte-Marguerite (12204)
 Rullac-Saint-Cirq (12207)
 Saint-Affrique (12208)
 Saint-André-de-Vézines (12211)
 Saint-Beaulize (12212)
 Saint-Beauzély (12213)
 Sainte-Eulalie-de-Cernon (12220)
 Saint-Félix-de-Sorgues (12222)
 Saint-Georges-de-Luzençon (12225)
 Saint-Izaire (12228)
 Saint-Jean-d'Alcapiès (12229)
 Saint-Jean-Delnous (12230)
 Saint-Jean-du-Bruel (12231)
 Saint-Jean-et-Saint-Paul (12232)
 Saint-Juéry (12233)
 Saint-Laurent-de-Lévézou (12236)
 Saint-Léons (12238)
 Saint-Rome-de-Cernon (12243)
 Saint-Rome-de-Tarn (12244)
 Saint-Sernin-sur-Rance (12248)
 Saint-Sever-du-Moustier (12249)
 Saint-Victor-et-Melvieu (12251)
 Salles-Curan (12253)
 Salmiech (12255)
 Sauclières (12260)
 Ségur (12266)
 La Selve (12267)
 La Serre (12269)
 Sylvanès (12274)
 Tauriac-de-Camarès (12275)
 Tournemire (12282)
 Trémouilles (12283)
 Le Truel (12284)
 Vabres-l'Abbaye (12286)
 Verrières (12291)
 Versols-et-Lapeyre (12292)
 Veyreau (12293)
 Vézins-de-Lévézou (12294)
 Viala-du-Pas-de-Jaux (12295)
 Viala-du-Tarn (12296)
 Le Vibal (12297)
 Villefranche-de-Panat (12299)

History

The arrondissement of Millau was created in 1800. At the January 2017 reorganization of the arrondissements of Aveyron, it lost six communes to the arrondissement of Rodez, and it gained 19 communes from the arrondissement of Rodez.

As a result of the reorganisation of the cantons of France which came into effect in 2015, the borders of the cantons are no longer related to the borders of the arrondissements. The cantons of the arrondissement of Millau were, as of January 2015:

 Belmont-sur-Rance
 Camarès
 Campagnac
 Cornus
 Millau-Est
 Millau-Ouest
 Nant
 Peyreleau
 Saint-Affrique
 Saint-Beauzély
 Saint-Rome-de-Tarn
 Saint-Sernin-sur-Rance
 Salles-Curan
 Sévérac-le-Château
 Vézins-de-Lévézou

References

Millau